The featherless bird-riddle is an international riddle type that compares a snowflake to a bird. In the nineteenth century, it attracted considerable scholarly attention because it was seen as a possible reflex of ancient Germanic riddling, arising from magical incantations. Although the language of the riddle is reminiscent of European charms, later work, particularly by Antti Aarne, showed that it occurred widely throughout Europe─particularly central Europe─and that it is therefore an international riddle type. Archer Taylor concluded that 'the equating of a snowflake to a bird and the sun to a maiden without hands is an elementary idea that cannot yield much information about Germanic myth'.

Versions
The riddle is first attested in Latin, as the fourth of six anonymous 'enigmata risibilia' ('silly riddles'), known today as the Reichenau Riddles, found in the early tenth-century manuscript Karlsruher Codex Augiensis 205, copied at Reichenau Abbey:

That is, the snowflake was blown by the wind and melted by the sun.

A representative early-modern German version is:

That is, 'the snow (featherless bird) lies on a bare tree in winter (leafless tree), and the sun (speechless maiden) causes the snow to melt (ate the featherless bird)'.

The best known English example runs
White bird featherless
Flew from Paradise,
Perched upon the castle wall;
Up came Lord John landless,
Took it up handless,
And rode away horseless to the King's white hall.

An Icelandic example runs:

References

Riddles